The 1983 GP Ouest-France was the 47th edition of the GP Ouest-France cycle race and was held on 23 August 1983. The race started and finished in Plouay. The race was won by Pierre Bazzo of the COOP–Mercier team.

General classification

References

1983
1983 in road cycling
1983 in French sport
August 1983 sports events in Europe